Superficial epigastric may refer to:
 Superficial epigastric artery
 Superficial epigastric vein